Silence = Death is a 1990 documentary film directed, written, and produced by Rosa von Praunheim (in cooperation with Phil Zwickler). The film received international resonance.

Plot
The film centers on the responses of gay artists in New York City to the AIDS crisis. The film's protagonists include Allen Ginsberg, Keith Haring and David Wojnarowicz.

Production notes
Silence = Death is the second part of Rosa von Praunheim's AIDS-Trilogy.

Awards
1990: Queer Film Prize of the Berlin International Film Festival (together with Positive)

Reception
The Guardian wrote in 1992: "Silence = Death and Positive: The best AIDS films to date." The Los Angeles Times wrote: "In short, Praunheim is just the man for the job he has taken on with Silence = Death and Positive: he has the breadth of vision, the compassion and the militance and, yes, the sense of humor necessary to tackle the AIDS epidemic in all its aspects." Critic Jerry Tallmer, founder of the Obie Award, wrote: "Rosa (originally Holger) von Praunheim, the brilliant, acerbic director of such breakthrough gay-revolutionist works as Silence & Death and A Virus Knows No Morals."

See also
Silence=Death Project

References

External links

1990 films
1990 documentary films
American documentary films
American LGBT-related films
German documentary films
West German films
German LGBT-related films
Documentary films about HIV/AIDS
Documentary films about New York City
Historiography of LGBT in New York City
Films directed by Rosa von Praunheim
1990 LGBT-related films
1990s English-language films
HIV/AIDS in American films
HIV/AIDS in German films
1990s American films
1990s German films